Kristian-Joy Alfonso (born September 5, 1963) is an American actress, former figure skater and fashion model. She is recognized for her portrayal of Hope Williams Brady on the NBC soap opera Days of Our Lives.

Early life 

Alfonso was born on September 5, 1963, in Brockton, Massachusetts, United States, as Kristian-Joy Alfonso. She is Italian-American; her grandparents hail from Sicily and Calabria. Kristian Alfonso was born to her parents Gino and Joanne. She has an older sister, Lisa.

Career

Early works 
She began her career as a figure skater and gold medal champion at the Junior Olympic Figure Skating Championships. At the age of 13, a tobogganing accident ended her skating career and Alfonso began modeling. By the time she was 15, she had appeared on the cover of over 30 magazines, including Vogue and Harper's Bazaar.  She was first seen on TV playing opposite Rock Hudson in the TV movie The Starmaker in 1981.

Days of Our Lives 
Alfonso's career took off in April 1983, when she landed the contract role of Hope Williams on the soap opera Days of Our Lives. The character of Hope become involved in a popular pairing with the character of Bo Brady (played by Peter Reckell). She received an Emmy nomination for Outstanding Younger Actress in a Drama Series in 1985.

Alfonso left in 1987, returning in 1990 for a brief stint, and full-time in 1994. In November 2019, it was announced the entire cast of Days of Our Lives were released from their contracts. Alfonso returned to the soap in February 2020. Five months later, she announced she had quit the role of Hope, and would not be returning when the soap resumed production after it shutdown due to the COVID-19 pandemic in the United States.

While part of the show, she also appeared in Season 6 of Friends in an episode titled "The One That Could Have Been, Part 1" as Hope.

Other work 
After Alfonso exited Days of Our Lives in April 1987, she was cast as Pilar Ortega on Falcon Crest for its last two seasons. In 1993, she starred alongside Dolph Lundgren in the film Joshua Tree, in which she played a cop abducted by an innocent convict on the run.

Alfonso's other film and television credits include MacGyver ("The Negotiator" and "Unfinished Business"), Blindfold: Acts of Obsession, Full House, Burke's Law, Murder, She Wrote, Melrose Place, Baywatch, Amazing Stories, “Out of Time” (1988 TV movie with Bill Maher), Love Stories and Who's the Boss?. She also co-starred with Kate Jackson in the CBS movie "Whatever Happened to Bobby Earl.

Personal life 
Alfonso was married to Simon Macauley from 1987 to 1991. They have a son, born in October 1990. She married Danny Daggenhurst on October 6, 2001. The couple have two children.

In November 2006, Alfonso created her own jewelry line called Hope Faith Miracles and a fashion line, Hope by Kristian Alfonso. Ten years later, she announced the company had been purchased, and she was no longer involved.

See also 
 Hope Williams Brady 
 Bo Brady and Hope Williams
 Supercouple

References

External links 
 
 

Living people
1963 births
People from Brockton, Massachusetts
Actresses from Massachusetts
Female models from Massachusetts
American female models
American people of Italian descent
American film actresses
American soap opera actresses
American television actresses
21st-century American women